Catch Phrase is an American game show which ran from September 16, 1985, through January 10, 1986, in syndication. The object of the show was to solve "catch phrases", which were animated picture puzzles designed to represent objects or sayings. Art James was the host of the show, his last game show hosting job before he retired from television, and John Harlan was the announcer. The program was created by Steve Radosh and produced by Pasetta Productions, with Telepictures distributing.

Although Catch Phrase did not succeed in its American run, the format found success in other countries. The British Catchphrase premiered two days after the American series came to an end in 1986 and aired weekly until 2004 and daily in late 2002 on the ITV network, which brought the series back in 2013. In Australia, the show premiered in 1997 on Nine with former Aussie Wheel of Fortune host John Burgess presiding, and was known as Burgo's Catch Phrase from 1999 until it ended in 2004.

Gameplay
Two contestants competed, one usually a returning champion. The champion stood behind a blue podium while the challenger stood behind a red podium.

Each catch phrase was drawn on a large screen by the show’s computer. Once there was enough information on the screen for the contestants to solve a catch phrase, a bell rang to alert them that they could buzz in and answer. If either contestant buzzed in before the bell rang, their opponent was allowed to see the remainder of the catch phrase and given a free guess. If a player gave a wrong answer, the other player got a chance to guess.

Correct answers added money to a bank. To determine how much money would be added to the bank for a correctly solved catch phrase, a randomizer was used before the start of each round of play. A total of nine dollar amounts were displayed on the screen and, to begin the game, the challenger would select one by hitting his/her buzzer to stop the randomizer. The amounts on the board ranged from $100 (originally $50) to $200 for the first round of catch phrases and increased in every round as the game progressed. For each subsequent round, control of the randomizer was given to the contestant that was trailing. 

Answering correctly gave the contestant that did so a chance to solve the Super Catch Phrase, a completed picture concealed behind nine squares. To pick a square, the contestant was given control of the randomizer and stopped it with his/her buzzer. The square that the randomizer stopped on was then removed from the board, and the contestant was given five seconds to study the puzzle and take a guess. If the contestant did so, he/she won the money in the bank and the round ended. Otherwise, play continued until someone solved the Super Catch Phrase or until all nine squares were uncovered without either contestant being able to solve. If that happened, the solution was given and a new round of play began with the unclaimed bank from the previous Super Catch Phrase carrying over.

The process repeated during the show as often as time permitted. If time was called in the middle of a round, the remaining squares in the Super Catch Phrase were revealed and the first player to buzz in and solve it won the bank. If neither player could, the game ended with the bank left unclaimed. 

The contestant in the lead when the game was completed was declared the day's champion and advanced to play for a bonus prize. Both players got to keep whatever cash they won, and the losing player also received parting gifts. However, in the event of a tie, a sudden-death playoff determined the champion.

Bonus Round
In the bonus game, the champion faced a board of 25 squares, each concealing a catch phrase and marked with a letter from A through Y. The board was laid out in a five-by-five grid, and the champion had to make a horizontal, vertical or diagonal line by solving catch phrases. The phrase hidden behind the letter M, in the center of the board, was always the most difficult. The champion had 60 seconds to complete a line, and could pass on phrases and return to them later if desired.

The champion could win one of two bonus prizes. If the champion made a vertical or horizontal line that did not include the M square, he/she won a prize that had a value of approximately $5,000; this was usually a vacation, but also could sometimes be a piece of merchandise such as a player piano. If the champion made a vertical or horizontal line that included the M, or made any diagonal, he/she would win a prize that was worth at least $10,000; this prize was often a car or a more extravagant vacation.

If the champion failed to complete a line before time expired, he/she won money for each square claimed. $200 per square was given unless the champion solved the catch phrase in the M square; doing this doubled the consolation prize money to $400 per square. 

Champions were allowed to return for five consecutive days. If a champion won on all five of those days, he/she was awarded an additional bonus prize on top of whatever he/she had won to that point. At various points in the run, that prize was a car, $10,000 in cash, or one of the larger merchandise prizes featured in the bonus round.

Overall, contestants on Catch Phrase could accumulate a total of $75,000. Host Art James made it a point to remind contestants and the viewing audience of this at the beginning of every episode.

In the first taped episodes of the show, which aired in December 1985, the bonus round was played in a different manner. While the rules were still the same, there was a different series of prize levels. A straight line without the middle square still won a prize in the neighborhood of $5,000. If the champion made the line with the M square, he/she received a choice of three more extravagant prizes worth over $10,000 each. In addition, if the champion did not win the bonus round, his/her consolation prizes were determined by a random shuffle before the round started; each square hid a different prize behind it and the champion won the prizes behind whatever catch phrases he/she solved.

Mascot
Catch Phrase used an animated robot named Herbie as a mascot. He was colored golden yellow with a red nose and red triangle around his neck, and made frequent appearances throughout each game performing some sort of action as part of a catch phrase. For instance, Herbie would be seen carrying a piece of paper with the word "FISHER" written on it and the solution to the catch phrase would be Carrie Fisher.

The British series had a robot mascot that looked almost identical to Herbie, but instead the producers named him "Mr. Chips".

Sale, cancellation, and replacement
When Catch Phrase was presented for potential affiliates at the 1985 NATPE Market & Conference in Los Angeles, Telepictures offered it as a barter series with a condition that, should it be cancelled before the 1985-86 television season ended, the stations airing it would receive a replacement at no additional cost if they wanted one. The company referred to this as an "insurance policy". 

Catch Phrase‘s ratings were low from the start, prompting action at what was now Lorimar-Telepictures. In November 1985, a pilot for a game show called Make a Match was shot, and the response was strong enough that the company wanted to put it on the air. The decision enabled Lorimar-Telepictures to invoke the condition and cease production on Catch Phrase, which company vice president Peter Temple said was showing “no upside”.

Catch Phrase came to an end on January 10. 1986 after thirteen weeks of episodes. The following Monday, its replacement series, which had its name changed to Perfect Match following the pilot, began airing; it, too, would eventually be cancelled.

2006 pilot
In 2006, a pilot was taped for a possible syndicated revival of Catch Phrase, called All-New Catch Phrase. Hosted by Todd Newton and produced in association with Granada USA, the pilot ultimately did not sell.

International versions
Status

  Currently broadcasting  Formerly broadcast  Upcoming or returning

References

External links
 
1980s American game shows
1985 American television series debuts
1986 American television series endings
Television series by Warner Bros. Television Studios
First-run syndicated television programs in the United States
Television series by Telepictures